Iridopsis obliquaria, the oblique looper moth, is a species of geometrid moth in the family Geometridae.

The MONA or Hodges number for Iridopsis obliquaria is 6577.

References

Further reading

 

Boarmiini
Articles created by Qbugbot
Moths described in 1883